Küngös is a village in Veszprém county, Hungary. Küngös has got a local museum and a castle and a chappele (Church). The catholic Church name is Saint Kinga Roman Catholic Church.

External links 
 Street map (Hungarian)

Populated places in Veszprém County